The 2011 CAF Confederation Cup (also known as the 2011 Orange CAF Confederation Cup for sponsorship reasons) was the 8th edition of the CAF Confederation Cup, Africa's secondary club football competition organized by the Confederation of African Football (CAF). The winners qualified to play in the 2012 CAF Super Cup.

Association team allocation
Theoretically, up to 55 CAF member associations may enter the 2011 CAF Confederation Cup, with the 12 highest ranked associations according to CAF 5-Year Ranking eligible to enter 2 teams in the competition. For this year's competition, CAF used . As a result, a maximum of 67 teams could enter the tournament – although this level has never been reached.

Ranking system

CAF calculates points for each entrant association based on their clubs' performance over the last 5 years in the CAF Champions League and CAF Confederation Cup, not taking into considering the running year. The criteria for points are the following:

The points shall be multiplied by a coefficient according to the year as follow:
2009 – 5
2008 – 4
2007 – 3
2006 – 2
2005 – 1

This system is different from the one used for the 2010 CAF Champions League and previous years.

Entrants list
Below is the entrants list for the competition. Nations are shown according to their 2005–2009 CAF 5-Year Ranking – those with a ranking score have their rank and score indicated. Teams were also seeded using their individual team 2006–2010 5-Year Ranking. The top twelve sides (shown in bold) received byes to the first qualifying round.

Notes
Associations that did not enter a team: Botswana, Cape Verde, Comoros, Djibouti, Eritrea, Gambia, Guinea-Bissau, Lesotho, Liberia, Malawi, Mauritius, Namibia, São Tomé and Príncipe, Seychelles, Somalia
Unranked associations have no ranking points and hence are equal 20th.

Moreover, the eight losers from the 2011 CAF Champions League second round entered the play-off round:
 ES Sétif
 Interclube
 ASEC Mimosas
 Al-Ittihad
 Diaraf
 Simba (loser of play-off due to disqualification of TP Mazembe)
 Club Africain
 ZESCO United

Dates
Schedule of dates for 2011 competition.

† The second leg of the preliminary round matches are postponed to 25–27 February in case the club have at least three players in the 2011 African Nations Championship.

Qualifying rounds

The fixtures for the preliminary, first and second qualifying rounds were announced on 20 December 2010.

Qualification ties were decided over two legs, with aggregate goals used to determine the winner. If the sides were level on aggregate after the second leg, the away goals rule applied, and if still level, the tie proceeded directly to a penalty shootout (no extra time is played).

Preliminary round

|}
Notes
Note 1: Nchanga Rangers advanced to the first round after Highlanders withdrew following the first leg.

First round

|}
Notes
Note 2: Al-Khartoum advanced to the second round after Al-Nasr withdrew. Tie was scheduled to be played over one leg due to the political situation in Libya, but match did not take place.
Note 3: USFA advanced to the second round after Africa Sports National withdrew. Tie was scheduled to be played over one leg due to the political situation in Côte d'Ivoire, but match did not take place.

Second round

|}
Notes
Note 4: Kaduna United advanced to the play-off round after being awarded the tie by CAF, as Etoile Sahel refused to travel to Nigeria for the first leg due to security concerns arising from rioting in the country following the 2011 Nigerian presidential election.

Play-off round
In the play-off round, the winners from the second round play against the losers from the 2011 CAF Champions League second round. The winners of the CAF Confederation Cup second round host the second leg at home.

The draw for the play-off round and group stage was held on 15 May 2011.
For the play-off round draw, the top-seeded loser from the Champions League and the top-seeded winner from the Confederation Cup would not be drawn against each other. Moreover, the winners of the two ties they are involved in would be drawn into different groups in the group stage draw.

|}
Notes
Note 5: Tie played over one leg due to the political situation in Libya.

Group stage

Group A

Group B

Knock-out stage

Bracket

Semifinals

|}

Final

Top goalscorers

The top scorers from the 2011 CAF Confederation Cup are as follows:

See also
 2011 CAF Champions League
 2012 CAF Super Cup

References

External links
CAF Confederation Cup

 
2011
2